Koti may refer to:

Places
 Koti, Armenia
 Koti Department, Burkina Faso, and its capital Koti, Burkina Faso
 Koti, Hyderabad, India
 Koti, Novo Mesto, Slovenia
 Koti Island, Mozambique
 Koti (princely state), now part of Solan district, Himachal Pradesh, India
 Koti, Himachal, a station on Kalka-Shimla UNESCO World Heritage mountain railway of India

People
 Koti (gender), or kothi, an effeminate man in the culture of the Indian subcontinent
 Koti (composer) (Saluri Koteswara Rao, fl. from 1983), a composer in the Indian film industry
 Koti and Chennayya (c. 1556–1591), legendary Tuluva twin heroes in the Tulu epic of the same name

Other uses
 Koti (clothing), a South Asian jacket worn by women
 Koti (number), or crore, denoting 10 million (100 lakh) in the Indian numbering system
 Koti (ship), an oil tanker seized by South Korea in 2017
 Koti language, spoken on Koti Island in Mozambique
 KOTI (TV), an American TV station licensed to Klamath Falls, Oregon
 The Korea Transport Institute, a South Korean think tank
 Kirkuk Oil Training Institute, of the Ministry of Oil (Iraq)

See also

 Kothi (disambiguation)
 Kōchi Prefecture, Japan